Buddy Rich Just Sings is a 1957 studio album by Buddy Rich, one of three vocal albums that Rich recorded.  The album has also been re-issued on CD with the contents of The Voice is Rich added as 'bonus' material.

Track listing 
 "Cathy" (Mel Tormé) – 3:24
 "Between the Devil and the Deep Blue Sea" (Harold Arlen, Ted Koehler) – 4:09
 "It's All Right with Me" (Arlen, Yip Harburg) – 2:32
 "Over the Rainbow" (Arlen, Harburg) – 4:19
 "You Took Advantage of Me" (Richard Rodgers, Lorenz Hart) – 3:43
 "Can't We Be Friends?" (Paul James, Kay Swift) – 3:29
 "It's Only a Paper Moon" (Arlen, Harburg) – 2:52
 "My Melancholy Baby" (Ernie Burnett, George A. Norton) – 3:03
 "Cheek to Cheek" (Irving Berlin) – 5:01
 "It Don't Mean a Thing (If It Ain't Got That Swing)" (Duke Ellington, Irving Mills) – 3:05
 "I Hadn't Anyone Till You" (Ray Noble) – 3:39

Personnel 
 Ben Webster - tenor saxophone
 Buddy Rich - vocals, drums
 Alvin Stoller - drums
 Harry "Sweets" Edison - trumpet
 Howard Roberts - guitar
 Paul Smith - piano
 Joe Mondragon - double bass
 Mike Mainieri - vibraphone

References 

1957 albums
Buddy Rich albums
Vocal jazz albums
Albums produced by Norman Granz
Verve Records albums